James Mugira is a lieutenant general in the Ugandan army. He is the managing director and chief executive officer of the National Enterprise Corporation (NEC),  the business arm of the Uganda People's Defence Force (UPDF). He was appointed to that position in April 2015. He concurrently serves as the managing director of Luweero Defence Industries Limited, the small-arms manufacturer owned by the UPDF. He has served in that capacity since 2011. From 2008 until 2011, at the rank of brigadier, he served as the director general of the Chieftaincy of Military Intelligence, a division of the UPDF. Before that, he served as the commanding officer of the UPDF Armored Brigade, based in Masaka.

Background and education
He was born in the Western Region of Uganda circa 1964. He studied law at Makerere University, graduating with a Bachelor of Laws degree. He then obtained a Diploma in Legal Practice from the Law Development Centre. His Master of Laws degree was obtained from the University of Manchester. He also holds a Master of Arts in international affairs from the University of Ghana.

Military career
In March 2016, as part of the plan to revitalize the NEC, the president of Uganda appointed two one-star generals as deputies to Mugira. In February 2019, Mugira was promoted from the rank of Major General to that of Lieutenant General, in a promotions exercise that involved over 2,000 troops.

Family
Mugira is married to Jackie Bayonga Mugira with four children. He was born to parents Marjorie and George Kanguhangire. Mugira has 9 siblings.

See also
 Nakibus Lakara
 David Muhoozi
 Muhoozi Kainerugaba
 Wilson Mbadi

References

1964 births
Living people
Ugandan generals
People from Western Region, Uganda
Law Development Centre alumni
Makerere University alumni
Alumni of the University of Manchester
University of Ghana alumni